Johan Wilhelm (Jukka) Rangell (25 October 1894 – 12 March 1982) was the Prime Minister of Finland from 1941 to 1943.

Educated as a lawyer, he was a close acquaintance of President Risto Ryti before the war, and made his initial career as a banker in the Bank of Finland. He played a role in the efforts at a 1940 Summer Olympics in Helsinki after the International Olympic Committee (IOC) retracted the original choice of Tokyo. After the resignation of President Kyösti Kallio during the Interim Peace, Risto Ryti was elected by the Electoral College as the new president of Finland on December 19, 1940, and Rangell rose to the position of Prime Minister. In office, Rangell's expertise and influence dealt mainly with economic issues, while more important foreign policy power rested on Commander-in-Chief Mannerheim, President Ryti and Foreign Minister Witting. Due to his connections to the IOC following the Berlin Olympics, Rangell's political orientation was seen as pro-German.

Rangell's cabinet's belligerent actions in the Continuation War enjoyed the support of the Parliament. He defended the occupation of East Karelia and the regaining of the areas ceded in the Peace of Moscow. During Reichsführer-SS Heinrich Himmler's state visit to Finland in August 1942, Rangell silenced Himmler's questions concerning the Jewish minority of Finland by famously stating: "Wir haben keine Judenfrage" ("We do not have a Jewish question").

He served as the Governor of the Bank of Finland from 1943 to 1944.

In the war-responsibility trials, Rangell was convicted for 6 years of prison in February 1946 for alleged crimes against peace. He was pardoned in 1949. After his release, Rangell did not return to politics, but continued to work for the Finnish Olympic Committee and the IOC until 1967. He also belonged to the board of Kansallis-Osake-Pankki bank.

Cabinets
 Rangell Cabinet

References

External links
 

1894 births
1982 deaths
People from Hämeenlinna
People from Häme Province (Grand Duchy of Finland)
National Progressive Party (Finland) politicians
Prime Ministers of Finland
Finnish bankers
Governors of the Bank of Finland
International Olympic Committee members
Finnish people of World War II
Finnish prisoners and detainees
Recipients of Finnish presidential pardons
University of Helsinki alumni
Heads of government who were later imprisoned
World War II political leaders
Prisoners and detainees of Finland